The First Flight Tournament was a professional golf tournament in Japan. Founded in 1972, it was an event on the Japan Golf Tour in its inaugural season in 1973. It was held at the Fuji Heigen Golf Club near Gotemba, Shizuoka.

Winners

References

Former Japan Golf Tour events
Defunct golf tournaments in Japan
Sport in Shizuoka Prefecture
Recurring sporting events established in 1972
Recurring sporting events disestablished in 1973
1972 establishments in Japan
1973 disestablishments in Japan